The R. Gapper Book Prize, originally titled R.H. Gapper Book Prize, offered by the Society for French Studies, is a monetary prize that was inaugurated in  2002 and has since been awarded annually for the best book published in the field of French Studies by a scholar based at an institution of higher education in the UK or Ireland. 
Since 2014 the prize has been named the R. Gapper prize, in honour of both Richard Paul Charles Gapper and his father.

Table of winners

References 

R.H. Gapper Book Prize
2002 establishments in Europe